Charles Coolidge may refer to:

 Charles A. Coolidge (1844–1926), U.S. Army general
 Charles Allerton Coolidge (1858–1936), American architect
 Charles H. Coolidge (1921–2021), U.S. Army soldier and Medal of Honor recipient
 Charles H. Coolidge Jr. (born 1946), United States Air Force lieutenant general, son of the above